The 2009 edition of Copa del Rey de Balonmano took place in Granollers, city of the autonomous community of Catalonia. This tournament was played by the 8 first of the Liga ASOBAL when reached the half of the league.

All matches were played in Palau D'Esports de Granollers with capacity of 8,300 seats.

2008-09 participants
BM Ciudad Real
Barcelona Borges
Portland San Antonio
Reale Ademar León
Pevafersa Valladolid
Fraikin Granollers Host Team
CAI BM Aragón
Octavio Pilotes Posadas

Bracket

Quarterfinals
11 March 2009:

(8) Octavio Pilotes Posadas 34-36 (7) CAI BM Aragón: (19:00, GTM+1) (Official Match Report)

(4) Reale Ademar León 28-32 (1) BM Ciudad Real: (21:00, GTM+1) (Official Match Report)

12 March 2009:

(3) Portland San Antonio 32-30 (5) Pevafersa Valladolid: (19:00, GTM+1) (Official Match Report)

(6) Fraikin Granollers 25-30  (2) Barcelona Borges: (21:00, GTM+1) (Official Match Report)

SemiFinals
14 March 2009:

(7) CAI BM Aragón 29-33 (1) BM Ciudad Real: (18:00, GTM+1) (Official Match Report)

(3) Portland San Antonio 26-35 (2) Barcelona Borges: (20:00, GTM+1) (Official Match Report)

Final
15 March 2009:

(1) BM Ciudad Real 26-29 (2) Barcelona Borges: (18:00, GTM+1) (Official Match Report)

Copa del Rey de Balonmano 2008/09 Champion: Barcelona Borges.

Television Broadcasting
Teledeporte
TVE2

Organizer
Liga ASOBAL 
Ajuntament de Granollers

Sponsors
Rehband Sport 
Aegon 
Kyocera 
Škoda Auto 
Mondo Ibérica 
Santiveri 
RENFE 
SabadellAtlántico

External links
2008/2009 Copa del Rey Official Website
Granollers tourism site Official Website

Copa del Rey de Balonmano seasons
Copa